Flax Island Creek is a river located in southern Otsego County, New York. The creek converges with the Susquehanna River by Otego, New York.

History
Flax Island Creek is named after a small island, called Flax Island, that used to be on the Susquehanna River below the mouth where the wild flax grew in abundance. In the resurvey of the Wallace patent in 1773 the island is shown as Flax Island.

References

Rivers of New York (state)
Rivers of Otsego County, New York